Liberator is the ninth studio album by English electronic band Orchestral Manoeuvres in the Dark (OMD), released on 14 June 1993 by Virgin. Recorded by OMD frontman Andy McCluskey along with musicians enlisted for the multi-million selling Sugar Tax (1991), the album ventures further into the dance-pop style explored by its predecessor.

Following the success of Sugar Tax, OMD staged a UK tour of large venues in support of Liberator, with Gary Numan as the opening act. The record did not match the popularity of its forebear, peaking at number 14 on the UK Albums Chart and selling almost half a million copies by mid-1996. It spawned three singles; lead single "Stand Above Me" and follow-up "Dream of Me" were Top 25 entries on the UK Singles Chart.

Reviews of Liberator were mixed. McCluskey later dismissed the record, calling it "busy and messy".

Background
Liberator treads further into the dance-pop style explored by multi-million selling predecessor Sugar Tax (1991), and embraces techno and house influences. It was recorded at The Pink Museum and The Ministry in Liverpool. Following the success of Sugar Tax, OMD staged a UK tour of large venues in support of Liberator, with Gary Numan as the opening act.

The second single, "Dream of Me (Based on Love's Theme)", uses a sample from the instrumental piece "Love's Theme", originally released in 1973 by Barry White's Love Unlimited Orchestra. OMD co-founder Paul Humphreys, who had left the group in 1989, is credited as co-writer of third single "Everyday", which dates to 1987. "Sunday Morning" is a cover of a Velvet Underground song, originally featured on The Velvet Underground & Nico (1967).

"Heaven Is" was first performed live by OMD in September 1983, prior to the release of the following year's Junk Culture. The track did not make that album, nor The Pacific Age (1986), for which it was heavily considered. The final Liberator version contains some lyrical variations, such as the name of the pornographic actress Christy Canyon as opposed to newsreader Selina Scott in the 1983 version.

Liberators title track was not completed in time for the album release. It was eventually included in the Souvenir 40th anniversary retrospective boxset in 2019, featuring on a CD of previously unreleased material. The track was first released in September on digital and streaming platforms ahead of the boxset. It was a song that McCluskey had been trying to write for several years from the late 1980s to the mid 1990s. The title inspiration comes from his love of WWII aircraft. There were several demo versions recorded, with the one released in 2019 being as close as the song got to the intended sound.

The cover art originally featured a variation of the "bomber girl" nose cone art used on many B-24 Liberator planes. The final artwork was designed by Area, with photography by Stephane Sednaoui and Joseph Hunwick.

Reception

Liberator met with mixed reviews. Mark LePage of The Gazette wrote, "The last of the Brit synth-pop electro-hookers has found freshness by re-tooling the genre's best moments... Liberator is hook-mad and relentlessly catchy, and even mildly inventive in parts." The Guardians Caroline Sullivan stated, "McCluskey can still turn out a catchy tune without so much as rumpling his cardigan. If the 12 here sound familiar, maybe it's because much of today's dance-pop is descended from OMD's early sound. Still, the LP does wander down a few new by-ways." Jeffrey Lee Puckett of The Courier-Journal observed, "At least on much of Liberator, [OMD] manages to tickle some latent fancy, coming off as breezy fun rather than canned button-pushing... OMD makes electronics bend to the will of the lovesick heart, drawing melancholy from machinery."

The Morning Calls Len Righi said, "If you long for the days when silly synth pop ruled... Liberator will set your spirit free." Lighi felt, however, that the bulk of the album "surrenders any claim to attention". Neil Spencer of The Observer stated, "Liberator repeats the [Sugar Tax] formula of swirling synths, crashing drum machines and trite, mournful songs; most of it sounds like the Brookside theme with added words, but of such banalities are massive hits made." Selects Dave Morrison described the record as "pleasant, disposable stuff", while Scott Hipper of the Santa Cruz Sentinel labelled it a "second-rate effort".

In a retrospective review, Trouser Press wrote, "All those years spent in the company of keyboards evidently left [McCluskey] fully able to make convincing percolating rhythms and layers of faux violins, and both get good use on what is a pretty stupid but diverting exercise." AllMusic editor Stephen Thomas Erlewine remarked, "While it is far from the experimental and edgy synth-pop that earned the group rave reviews in the early '80s, [Liberator] is an enjoyable, lightweight collection of appealing dance-pop."

Liberator had sold almost half a million copies by mid-1996.

Band response
McCluskey has dismissed Liberator, believing that he "messed up" the album. He has also criticised the single "Everyday". In a 2019 interview McCluskey said:

Track listing

Personnel
 Andy McCluskey – programming, production on tracks 1–4, and 6–12
 Phil Coxon – programming, production on tracks 1–4, and 6–12
 Beverly Reppion – backing vocals on tracks 1, 2, 4, 5, 6, and 12
 Nathalie James – backing vocals on tracks 4, and 8
 Doreen Edwards – backing vocals on track 9
 backing vocals on track 5
 Stuart Boyle – guitar on tracks 1, and 6
 Nigel Ipinson – piano and arrangement on track 6
 Le Mystère des Voix Bulgares – a sample from "Bezrodna Nevesta" is used in track 7
 Barry White – production on track 5
 Mark Phythian – engineer
 Paul Butcher – assistant engineer
 Ian Collins – assistant engineer
 Pat O'Shaughnessy – assistant engineer
 Mike Hunter – assistant engineer
 Andrea Wright – assistant engineer
 Tony Cousins – mastering at Town House, London
 Gregg Jackman – mix for tracks 1, 2, 4, 5, 9, 10, 12
 Niall Flynn – assistant mix for tracks 1, 2, 4, 5, 9, 10, 12

Mixed at Amazon Studios, Liverpool
Tracks 1, 2, 4, 5, 9, 10, 12 mixed at Sarm West, London

Charts

References

External links
 Lyrics

1993 albums
Orchestral Manoeuvres in the Dark albums
Virgin Records albums